Paxten Reid Aaronson (born August 26, 2003) is an American professional soccer player who plays as an attacking midfielder for Bundesliga club Eintracht Frankfurt.

Club career

Philadelphia Union 
Aaronson began his career with the Philadelphia Union's YSC Academy and played for the club in the U.S. Soccer Development Academy. After five seasons with the academy, Aaronson was called up to the Philadelphia Union II, the Philadelphia Union reserve team in USL Championship. He made his competitive debut for Union II on July 22, 2020, against New York Red Bulls II, as a 67th minute substitute for Steve Kingue.

In August 2020, Aaronson signed a homegrown contract with the first team beginning in 2021. In May 2021, he made his first team debut with the Union as a substitute in a 3–0 win over the Portland Timbers. Aaronson earned his first start for the Union in August where he scored the Union's equalizing goal against the New England Revolution. His debut goal earned him the league's Goal of the Week honor.

Eintracht Frankfurt 
On November 17, 2022, it was announced that the Philadelphia Union and Bundesliga club Eintracht Frankfurt had reached a deal for the transfer of Aaronson. The fee of the deal was reported to be in the region of $4 million (plus add-ons), with a sell-on percentage for the Union also included.

International career
In June 2022, Aaronson was called up to the United States national under-20 team at the 2022 CONCACAF U-20 Championship, where he scored seven goals in seven games, earning him both the Golden Ball and Golden Boot Awards at the tournament.

On January 29, 2023, he debuted in the United States men's national soccer team in a friendly match against Colombia.

Personal life
Paxten is the younger brother of Leeds United and United States midfielder Brenden Aaronson.

Career statistics

Club

International

Honors
United States U20
CONCACAF U-20 Championship: 2022

Individual
CONCACAF U-20 Championship Best XI: 2022
CONCACAF U-20 Championship Golden Ball: 2022
CONCACAF U-20 Championship Golden Boot: 2022

References

External links
Profile at the U.S. Soccer Development Academy website

2003 births
People from Medford, New Jersey
Sportspeople from Burlington County, New Jersey
Soccer players from New Jersey
Living people
American men's soccer players
United States men's under-20 international soccer players
United States men's international soccer players
Association football midfielders
Philadelphia Union II players
Philadelphia Union players
Eintracht Frankfurt players
USL Championship players
Major League Soccer players
Homegrown Players (MLS)
American expatriate soccer players
American expatriate soccer players in Germany